Opacoptera flavicana is a moth in the family Lecithoceridae. It was described by Chun-Sheng Wu and You-Qiao Liu in 1992. It is found in China.

References

Moths described in 1992
Lecithoceridae